Deseo (meaning desire or wish) is the sixth solo album by Yes lead singer Jon Anderson, released in 1994. Augmented by well-known artists from across South and Latin America, with cameos from María Conchita Alonso, Cecilia Toussaint, Milton Nascimento, and many others.

The Deseo Remixes
In 1995, The Deseo Remixes was released featuring eight remixes of the material from Deseo by Deep Forest, Trans-Global Underground, Future Sound of London and Global Communication.

Track listing
"Amor Real" – 4:17
"A-DE-O" – 3:19
"Bridges" – 3:32
"Seasons" – 3:34
"Floresta" – 3:04
"Cafe" – 3:19
"This Child" – 2:14
"Dança Do Ouro" – 4:29
"Midnight Dancing" – 3:50
"Deseo" – 5:32
"Latino" – 3:18
"Bless This" – 2:56

Written and produced by Jon Anderson, except "A-DE-O", written by Milton Nascimento/Pedro Casadaliga/Pedro Tierra, and "Dança Do Ouro" by Zé Renato/Lourenço Baeta.

Personnel 

Jon Anderson – vocals and keyboards
Deborah Anderson – backing vocals
Otmaro Ruiz – keyboards
Freddy Ramos – guitar
Aaron Serafaty – percussion
Eduardo del Signore – bass
Milton Nascimento – vocals on "Amor Real"
Mountain Girls – vocals on "A-DE-O"
Glenn Monroig – vocals on "Cafe"
Boca Livre – vocals on "Dança Do Ouro"
Valentina Vargas – vocals on "Midnight Dancing"
Cecilia Toussaint – vocals on "Deseo"
Girls of Puerto Rico – vocals on "Latino"
Vanessa Mixco – voice on "Bless This"
Rubén Rada – percussion and vocals on "Seasons"
Steve Thornton – percussion on "Amor Real" and "Midnight Dancing"
Lorenza Pose – violin on "Amor Real" and "Midnight Dancing"
Paul Haney – sax on "Amor Real"
Jorge Laboy – guitar on "Cafe"
The Reedam Singers – Deborah Anderson, Nina Swan, Liza Gelabart, Carla Day and Francis Benitez
 Eduardo Del Signore – bass, production, composition
 Toshio Sone Vasquez – design, packaging
 Ron Salaises – sound effects
 Ron Wasserman – engineering
 Freddy Ramos – guitar
 Otmaro Ruiz – keyboards
 Ric Wilson – mastering
 Aaron Serfaty – percussion
 Miyoko Sone – photography
 Glen Wexler – inlay photography
 John Laraio – production equipment assistance
 Gary Barlough – recording (early recording in Big Bear)

References 

1994 albums
Jon Anderson albums